Jaya Luintel is a Nepali journalist.

Biography
Luintel completed a bachelor's degree in sociology and anthropology. She began her career in 1999, working at Radio Sagarmatha in Kathmandu, Nepal. In 2002 she launched the station's first show focusing on gender issues. In 2012, Luintel co-founded The Story Kitchen, an organisation which trains women who were victims of Nepal's civil war to be reporters.

In 2014 she was named an Asia Foundation Development Fellow, and she was also recognized as one of the BBC's 100 women of 2014. The same year, she organised Nepal's first national conference for women in radio broadcasting.

In 2010-2011 Luintel held a John S. Knight Journalism Fellowship at Stanford University.

References

Living people
Nepalese journalists
People from Kathmandu District
Year of birth missing (living people)
Nepalese women journalists
BBC 100 Women